Home Guard is a potato variety grown mainly in Ireland. Of an oval shape it is an early variety with moderate to low yields, typically harvested and available in shops by mid-May. The flesh is white or cream coloured, but shows a tendency to discoloration when cooked. It is susceptible to several diseases, including blight, potato cyst nematode and powdery scab.

References

External links 

Potato cultivars